Jacques Tiné (1914-2009) was a French diplomat.

Early life
Jacques Tiné was born on May 24, 1914 in Algiers, French Algeria. His father was a corporate director.

He was educated in Algiers. He then received a degree in Law from the University of Paris and graduated from Sciences Po.

Career
Tiné started his career as a diplomat in 1935. He was an attache at the French embassy in Los Angeles, California in 1938–1939.

In 1941, he was recommended by Charles-Antoine Rochat to join the main bureau of the French Ministry of Foreign Affairs. Later, he replaced Bernard de Chalvron as an advisor on French Algeria to Marshal Philippe Pétain.

He served as the French Ambassador to Portugal from 1969 to 1973. He then served as France's permanent representative to NATO from 1975 to 1979.

Death
He died on April 19, 2009.

References

1914 births
2009 deaths
People from Algiers
Pieds-Noirs
University of Paris alumni
Sciences Po alumni
People of Vichy France
Ambassadors of France to Portugal
Permanent Representatives of France to NATO
Migrants from French Algeria to France